The Coffee with... biography series is a selection of books published by Duncan Baird between 2007 and 2008 each containing fictional conversations with real famous people, conveying biographical fact. A review of Coffee with Oscar Wilde in The Independent, for example, explains that in it the author, Wilde's grandson Merlin Holland, "offers an imaginary and imaginative conversation between himself and his grandfather, set in a contemporary Parisian café". The review described that volume as "an ideal introduction to Wilde's seductive and intellectually electrifying world".

The first set of volumes published in 2007 covered eight figures: Ernest Hemingway, Gautama Buddha, Marilyn Monroe, Michelangelo, Mozart, Plato, Oscar Wilde, and Groucho Marx.

Works in the series

References

External links
Coffee with... series at LibraryThing
"Coffee With Hemingway (review)" by Timothy Galow for The Hemingway Review

Series of books